Marupadi is a 2016 Indian Malayalam-language drama film written by Juliana Ashraf and directed by V.M. Vinu. It stars Rahman, Bhama and Baby Nayanthra in the lead roles. The film is produced by Ashraf Bedi under the banner of Bedi Motion Pictures. The film was released on 9 December 2016.

Plot 
The film is based on a real life incident which took place in North India and it portrays the story of a family which is permanently chased by the law and power. The film is centered around the family of Aby (Rahman), a bank employee, his spouse Sara (Bhama), an orphan and their teenaged daughter Riya (Baby Nayanthara). While leading a peaceful life, Aby gets a punishment transfer to Kolkata due to some issues in the bank he worked. On their journey to the new residence at Kolkata, the anti-narcotic squad finds some drugs in their car, which led them to jail, where Sara and Riya faces sexual onsets from the police officers and inmates. The film points finger against the prevailing social and legal systems which makes the life of innocent people tragic. Moreover, it picturize the pathetic conditions of women and children in the present day society.

Cast 
 Rahman as Aby/Abraham
 Bhama as Sara Elizabeth (Aby's wife)
 Nayanthara Chakravarthy as Riya (Aby's daughter)
 Anu Sithara as Riya
 Santosh Keezhattoor as Aby's friend
 Tessa Joseph
 Janardhanan
 Shivaji Guruvayoor
 Arjun Nandhakumar as Vijay
 Valsala Menon
 Srinda Ashab
 M.G. Sasi
 Sudip Mukherjee
 Krishna Kumar
 Devan
 Meenakshi

Soundtrack 
The soundtrack for the film was composed by M. Jayachandran and the background score was scored by Gopi Sundar, with lyrics penned by Rafeeq Ahamed.

Track listing

Critical reception 
Deepa Soman for The Times of India stated, "With its fair share of pitfalls and loopholes, our legal justice system has been existing in our midst, to make important decisions on people lives, for long. When women are at its receiving end, the system gets a lot more skewed. Marupadi, a film by V.M. Vinu, typifies such a frightful situation, demanding some scary answers and solutions if any". Filmihood.com rated the movie 3 out of 5.

References

External links 
 
 

2016 films
2010s Malayalam-language films
Indian drama films
Films shot in Kolkata
Films directed by V. M. Vinu